Fremont Peak is the third highest peak in the state of Wyoming, surpassed only by Gannett Peak and Grand Teton, and straddles the boundary between Fremont and Sublette counties in the Wind River Range. It is named for American explorer John C. Fremont who climbed the peak with Charles Preuss and Johnny Janisse from August 13 to August 15, 1842. Kit Carson had been with the climbing party on its first attempt at the peak, but had gone back for supplies the day Fremont and his men reached the summit. Carson is thought by some to have been the first to climb neighboring Jackson Peak. At that time, Fremont Peak was mistakenly thought to be the highest mountain in the Rocky Mountains, although there are actually over 100 higher peaks in the Rocky Mountain range.

Geography 
The peak is located on the Continental Divide and is the second highest peak in the remote Wind River Range after Gannett Peak. The east flank of the peak is in the Fitzpatrick Wilderness of Shoshone National Forest, while the west side is in the Bridger Wilderness of Bridger-Teton National Forest. The Upper Fremont Glacier is located on the north slopes of the mountain.

Climbing 
Due to the remote location and difficult ascent, most mountain climbers spend a total of three to five days hiking up to the mountain, climbing to the summit and then later hiking back to their starting point.

Hazards

Encountering bears is a concern in the Wind River Range. There are other concerns as well, including bugs, wildfires, adverse snow conditions and nighttime cold temperatures.

Importantly, there have been notable incidents, including accidental deaths, due to falls from steep cliffs (a misstep could be fatal in this class 4/5 terrain) and due to falling rocks, over the years, including 1993, 2007 (involving an experienced NOLS leader), 2015 and 2018. Other incidents include a seriously injured backpacker being airlifted near SquareTop Mountain in 2005, and a fatal hiker incident (from an apparent accidental fall) in 2006 that involved state search and rescue. The U.S. Forest Service does not offer updated aggregated records on the official number of fatalities in the Wind River Range.

See also
 List of mountain peaks of the United States
 List of Ultras of the United States

References

Bridger–Teton National Forest
Mountains of Fremont County, Wyoming
Mountains of Sublette County, Wyoming
Mountains of Wyoming
Shoshone National Forest